Cats are an invasive species in Australia. Because they are not native to Australia and were only introduced by colonisers as pets in the early 1800s, native Australian animals did not co-evolve with them. , some 3.8 million domestic cats and up to 6.3 million feral cats continue to live in Australia. Every year domestic and feral cats in Australia are estimated to kill 
1.067 billion mammals, 399 million birds, 609 million reptiles, and 92 million frogs. As one of the most ecologically damaging and the most costly invasive species in Australia, predation by both domestic and feral cats has played a role in the extinction of many of Australia's Indigenous animals. For instance, cats are found to have significantly contributed to the extinction of at least 22 endemic Australian mammals since the arrival of Europeans.

For biosecurity reasons, any cats that are imported into Australia must meet conditions set by the Department of Agriculture, Fisheries and Forestry.

Historical context
Historical records date the introduction of cats by European colonisers to Australia at around 1804 and that cats first became feral around Sydney by 1820. In the early 1900s concern was expressed at the pervasiveness of the cat problem.

Domesticated cats

Each pet cat in Australia kills an estimated 110 native animals each year; totalling up to about 80 million native birds, 67 million native mammals and 83 million native reptiles being killed by them annually. Responsible cat owners in Australia keep their cats indoors at all times to prevent them from killing native animals.

Almost 30% of Australian households keep at least one domesticated cat. Domesticated cats must be microchipped in every state of Australia except Tasmania. All pet cats past six months of age must be desexed in the Australian Capital Territory, Tasmania, South Australia and Western Australia.

Feral cats

Ecological damage
Feral cats are a major invasive species and have been linked to the decline and extinction of various native animals in Australia. They have been shown to cause a significant impact on ground-nesting birds and small native mammals. A study in the 2010s estimated that each feral cat kills 740 wild animals per year. Feral cats have also hampered attempts to reintroduce threatened species back into areas where they have become extinct, as the cats quickly kill the newly released animals. Environmentalists conclude that feral cats have been an ecological disaster in Australia, inhabiting almost all of its ecosystems, and being implicated in the extinction of several marsupial and placental mammal species.

A field experiment conducted in Heirisson Prong (Western Australia) compared small mammal populations in areas cleared of both foxes and cats, of foxes only, and a control plot. Researchers found the first solid evidence that predation by feral cats can cause a decline in native mammals. It also indicates that cat predation is especially severe when fox numbers have been reduced. Cats may play a role in Australia's altered ecosystems; with foxes they may be controlling introduced rabbits, particularly in arid areas, which themselves cause ecological damage. Cats are believed to have been a factor in the extinction of the only mainland bird species to be lost since European settlement, the paradise parrot. Cats in Australia have no natural predators except dingoes and wedge-tailed eagles, and as a result, they are apex predators where neither the dingo nor the eagle exists. Also, dingos do not appear to affect the activity of cats.

Claimed benefits
Some researchers argue that feral cats may suppress and control the number of rats and rabbits, and cat eradication may damage native species indirectly.

Economic impacts
Cats are the costliest invasive species in Australia.

Control
Pintupi, Nyirripi and other Western Desert peoples in Western Australia and Northern Territory have been hunting cats to use as a food source and for bush medicine for decades, but in 2015 they were also participating in a program with ecologists to help monitor and reduce cat predation on threatened species.

Varmint hunters of feral cats in Australia face backlash and even death threats for the culling of the invasive species.

Since 2016, a program on Kangaroo Island aims to fully eradicate the island's feral cat population, estimated at between 3000 and 5000, by 2030. The 2019-2020 bushfires have complicated the eradication efforts, as the gradual regrowth of the burnt brush creates favourable conditions for cat breeding and makes them more difficult to hunt. By the end of 2021, at least 850 cats had been removed from the burnt area at the western end of the island using state-of-the-art technology with traps and cameras. In addition, an exclusion fence had been built on private property around some of the burnt land, helping to protect the populations of Kangaroo Island dunnart and southern brown bandicoot.

Phantom cats
The numerous sightings of phantom cats in Australia include the Gippsland phantom cat and the Blue Mountains panther.

Australian folklore holds that some feral cats have grown so large as to cause inexperienced observers to claim sightings of cougars in Western Australia. While this rarely occurs in reality, large specimens are occasionally found: in 2005, a feline was measured to be 176 cm from the tip of its nose to the tip of its tail in the Gippsland area of Victoria. Subsequent DNA tests showed it to be a feral cat.

See also

Hunting in Australia
Threatened fauna of Australia
Environmental issues in Australia

References

External links
Feral Cat Felix catus, Department of Sustainability, Environment, Water, Population and Communities
Predation by feral cats - Threat abatement plan - Department of Sustainability, Environment, Water, Population and Communities
Management of cats in Australia - Australian Veterinary Association
Australian Companion Animal Council

 
Fauna naturalised in Australia
Invasive animal species in Australia